Air Marshal Suraj Kumar Jha, AVSM is an officer in the Indian Air Force. He is currently serving as the Air Officer-in-Charge Personnel. He assumed the office on 1 August 2021 succeeding Air Marshal Richard John Duckworth. Previously, he served as Deputy Chief of the Air Staff at Air Headquarters Vayu Bhawan in New Delhi succeeding Air Marshal Sandeep Singh.

Early life and education 
Suraj Kumar Jha is an alumnus of Defence Services Staff College.

Career
Suraj Kumar Jha was commissioned as a fighter pilot in the Indian Air Force on 8 June, 1984. In a distinguish career spanning 37 years, he has flown a variety of fighter and trainer aircraft with more than 2900 hours of operational flying.

With a career of 37 years in the IAF, he was the commanding officer of a front line fighter aircraft squadron and a fighter base. As an Air Vice Marshal, he served as the Air Officer Commanding Advance Headquarters, was the Commandant of College of Air Warfare, Assistant Chief of Integrated Defence Staff. He is an alumnus of Defence Services Staff College, Wellington.

Honours and decorations 
During his career, Suraj Kumar Jha was awarded the Ati Vishisht Seva Medal in 2021 and was Mention-in-Despatches by Chief of the Air Staff in 1999 for his actions in Kargil War.

References 

Indian Air Force air marshals
Recipients of the Ati Vishisht Seva Medal
Year of birth missing (living people)
Living people
Commandants of College of Air Warfare
Defence Services Staff College alumni